Porodin is a village in the municipality of Bitola, North Macedonia. It used to be part of the former municipality of Bistrica.

History
Porodin contains two major archaeological sites within its boundaries. Bara Tumba, a Neolithic settlement, was discovered in 1953 and its findings are kept at the Institute and Museum Bitola. Veluška Tumba is also a Neolithic site.

Demographics
According to the 1467-68 Ottoman defter, the village had 68 houses, 4 bachelors and 8 widows. Some of the heads of families had traditional Albanian names, such as the following: Gjin Arnaut (t. Arbanas), Goja son of Vilan, Koja (Goja) son of Nikola, Koja son of Dragusha, Lazor Koja, Dimitri son of Koja ( Goja).

In statistics gathered by Vasil Kanchov in 1900, the village of Porodin was inhabited by 300 Christian Bulgarians and 190 Muslim Albanians. According to the 2002 census, the village had a total of 202 inhabitants. Ethnic groups in the village include:

Macedonians 194
Albanians 6
Others 2

References

External links

Villages in Bitola Municipality
Albanian communities in North Macedonia